Jacinto Guerrero (16 August 1895 Ajofrín, Toledo, Spain – 15 September 1951 Madrid, Spain), was a prolific composer of zarzuelas and revues, as well as some orchestral compositions.

Guerrero was educated at the choir school in Toledo and Madrid Royal Conservatory.
Amongst his best-known works are:

 La montería (The Hunt, 1923)
 Los gavilanes (The Sparrowhawks, 1924)
 El huésped del sevillano (The Guest at the Sevillano Inn, 1926)
 La rosa del azafrán (The Saffron Rose, 1930)

Selected filmography
 Bound for Cairo (1935)
 Currito of the Cross (1936)

External links
Biographical Page
Los gavilanes synopsis
El huésped del Sevillano synopsis
La montería synopsis
La rosa del azafrán synopsis

References
Zarzuela.net

Spanish opera composers
Madrid Royal Conservatory alumni
Male opera composers
Spanish classical composers
Spanish male classical composers
1895 births
1951 deaths
20th-century classical composers
20th-century Spanish composers
20th-century Spanish male musicians